The Malian Armed Forces consists of the Army, Republic of Mali Air Force, and National Guard. They number some 7,000 and are under the control of the Minister of Armed Forces and Veterans. The Library of Congress as of January 2005 stated that "[t]he military is underpaid, poorly equipped, and in need of rationalization. Its organisation has suffered from the incorporation of Tuareg irregular forces into the regular military following a 1992 agreement between the government and Tuareg rebel forces."

In 2009, the IISS Military Balance listed 7,350 soldiers in the Army, 400 in the Air Force, and 50 in the Navy. The Gendarmerie and local police forces (under the Ministry of Interior and Security) maintain internal security. The IISS listed paramilitary total force as 4,800 personnel: 1,800 in the Gendarmerie (8 companies), 2,000 in the Republican Guard, and 1,000 police officers. A few Malians receive military training in the United States, France, and Germany.

Military expenditures total about 13% of the national budget. Mali is an active contributor to peacekeeping forces in West and Central Africa; the Library of Congress said that in 2004 Mali was participating in United Nations operations in the Democratic Republic of Congo (MONUC, 28 personnel including 27 observers), Liberia (UNMIL, 252 personnel, including 4 observers), and Sierra Leone (3 observers).

History
The Malian armed forces were initially formed by Malian conscript and volunteer veterans of the French Armed Forces. In the months preceding the formation of the Malian armed forces, the French Armed Forces withdrew from their bases in Mali.
. Among the last bases to be closed were those at Kati, on 8 June 1961, Tessalit (une base aérienne secondaire), on 8 July 1961, Gao (base aérienne 163 de Gao), on 2 August 1961, and Air Base 162 at Bamako (base aérienne 162 de Bamako), on 5 September 1961.

"On 1 October 1960, the Malian army was created and solemnly installed through a speech by Chief of Staff Captain Sekou Traore. On 12 October the same year, the population of Bamako attended for the first time an army parade under the command of Captain Tiemoko Konate. Organizationally, says Sega Sissoko, is the only battalion of Ségou and includes units scattered across the territory. A memo from the Chief of Staff ordered a realignment of the battalion. Following on, a command and services detachment in Bamako was created, and the engineer company in Ségou, the first Saharan motorized company of Gao, the Saharan Motor Company of Kidal, the Arouane nomad group, nomadic group of Timetrine (in the commune of Timtaghène), the 1st Reconnaissance Company and Nioro 2nd Reconnaissance Company Tessalit. As of 16 January 1961, Mali's army totaled 1232 men."

In the sixties and seventies, Mali's army and air force relied primarily on the Soviet Union for materiel and training.

On 19 November 1968, a group of young Malian officers staged a bloodless coup and set up a 14-member military junta, with Lieutenant Moussa Traoré as president. The military leaders attempted to pursue economic reforms, but for several years faced debilitating internal political struggles and the disastrous Sahelian drought. A new constitution, approved in 1974, created a one-party state and was designed to move Mali toward civilian rule. The military leaders remained in power.

Single-party presidential and legislative elections were held in June 1979, and General Moussa Traoré received 99% of the votes. His efforts at consolidating the single-party government were challenged in 1980 by student-led anti-government demonstrations, which were brutally put down, and by three coup attempts. The Traore government ruled throughout the 1970s and 1980s. On 26 March 1991, after four days of intense anti-government rioting, a group of 17 military officers, led by subsequent President Amadou Toumani Touré, arrested President Traoré and suspended the constitution. They formed a civilian-heavy provisional ruling body, and initiated a process that led to democratic elections.

The Tuareg rebellion began in 1990 when Tuareg separatists attacked government buildings around Gao. The armed forces' reprisals led to a full-blown rebellion in which the absence of opportunities for Tuareg in the army was a major complaint. The conflict died down after Alpha Konaré formed a new government and made reparations in 1992. Also, Mali created a new self-governing region, the Kidal Region, and provided for greater Tuareg integration into Malian society. In 1994, Tuareg, reputed to have been trained and armed by Libya, attacked Gao, which again led to major Malian Army reprisals and to the creation of the Ghanda Koi Songhai militia to combat the Tuareg.  Mali effectively fell into civil war.

As of June 2008, service commanders were Colonel Boubacar Togola (Armée de Terre), Colonel Waly Sissoko (Armée de l'Air), Lieutenant-Colonel Daouda Sogoba (Garde Nationale) et du Colonel Adama Dembélé (Gendarmerie Nationale).

The Malian army largely collapsed during the war against Tuareg separatists and Islamist rebels in early 2012. In a span of less than fourth months at the start of 2012, the Malian army was defeated by the rebels who seized more than 60% of the former Malian territory, taking all camps and position of the army, capturing and killing hundreds of Malian soldiers, while hundred others deserted or defected.

Following the rebel advance, a group of soldiers from the Kati camp near Bamako staged a coup on 22 March 2012 which overthrew Malian president Amadou Toumani Touré. After the junta seized power, they successfully repelled a counter coup on 30 April by loyalists from the red berets elite units.

The Malian military was rebuilt by French forces, and is now capable of conducting counter terrorism operations. In February 2020, the army stated that up to 200 Malian troops arrived in Kidal, a Northern city. This was the first time the army was deployed in this area because of the Tuareg Separatists rebels that chased out the army since 2014.

Army

Manpower is provided by two-year selective conscription. Mali apparently has six military regions, according to Jane's World Armies. The 1st Military Region and 13th Combined Arms Regiment may be in Gao. The 3rd Military Region appears to be at Kati. The 4th Military Region is at Kayes and the 5th Military Region is at Timbuktu.

The 512 Regiment was reported within the 5th Military Region in 2004.
In 2010 Agence France-Presse reported that French training would be given to the 62nd Motorized Infantry Regiment of the 6th Military Region, based at Sévaré. The same story said that the regiment consisted of three Rapid Intervention Companies (CIR) and AFP said it was "considered the elite...of the Malian army."

Mali is one of four Saharan states which created a Joint Military Staff Committee in 2010, to be based at Tamanrasset in southern Algeria. Algeria, Mauritania, Niger, and Mali were to take part.

The 134e Escadron de Reconnaissance (reconnaissance squadron) was to be trained to operate the French ACMAT Bastion APC by the EUTM Mali.

The Army controls the small navy (approx. 130 sailors and 3 river patrol boats).

Sources: Mali Actu  17 February 2012: Liste des généraux du Mali sous ATT : À quoi servaient-ils ? Quel sera leur sort ?  and Le Monde-Duniya du 12 avril 2012: Les Generaux du MALI

Equipment currently in service with the Malian Army

Equipment formerly in service with the Malian Army

Training establishments 
The Malian armed forces have at least two significant training establishments:
 Joint Military School at Koulikoro
 Alioune Blondin Beye Peacekeeping Training School at Bamako (:fr:École de maintien de la paix Alioune Blondin Beye de Bamako)
The Alioune Bloundin Beye school is the tactical-level component of a trio of three ECOWAS peacekeeping training schools: the Alioune Bloundin Beye school (EMPABB), the Kofi Annan International Peacekeeping Training Centre in Accra, Ghana (operational level), and the Nigerian National Defence College (strategic level). The school has trained over 6900 students since its opening and is currently supported financially and technically by seven countries and as well a

s the ECOWAS.

Air Force

The Mali Air Force (Armée de l'air du Mali) was founded in 1961 with French supplied military aid. This included MH.1521 Broussard utility monoplane followed by two C-47 transports until Soviet aid starting in 1962 with four Antonov AN-2 Colt biplane transports and four Mi-4 light helicopters. It used to operate MiG jets but is currently equipped with cargo aircraft, light attack aircraft and helicopters.

References

Further reading 
'Insurgency, disarmament, and insecurity in Northern Mali 1990–2004,' in Nicolas Florquin and Eric G. Berman (eds.) Armed and Aimless Armed Groups, Guns, and Human Security in the ECOWAS Region, Small Arms Survey, May 2005
Mahamadou Nimaga, 'Mali', in Alan Bryden, Boubacar N'Diaye, 'Security Sector Governance in Francophone West Africa: Realities and Opportunities,' DCAF/Lit Verlag, 2011.
Jared Rudacille, "Security Sector Reform's Utility in Conflict Prevention," Monograph written as part of a degree requirement at the US School of Advanced Military Studies, November 2013. (Includes case study of US aid to security sector reform in Mali, 2004–2012.)

External links 

 Soldiers training during the Northern Mali conflict
 http://www.jamana.org/lesechos/articles/2005/septembre/ec1_actu15_0905.html – two new Malian generals, total eight
 https://web.archive.org/web/20101224193445/http://www.wikileaks.ch/cable/2009/12/09BAMAKO815.html – "Closing ceremony of JCET training for Malian army"

Government of Mali
Mali